De Natura Fossilium is a scientific text written by Georg Bauer also known as Georgius Agricola, first published in 1546. The book represents the first scientific attempt to categorize minerals, rocks and sediments since the publication of Pliny's Natural History. This text along with Agricola's other works including De Re Metallica compose the earliest comprehensive "scientific" approach to mineralogy, mining, and geological science.

Notes

References

External links
 Full text searchable English version and illustrations

Works about mining
Books by Georgius Agricola
1546 books
16th-century Latin books